V34, or similar, may refer to:
 Brazilian corvette Barroso (V34)
 Fokker V.34, a German prototype fighter aircraft of World War I
 V.34, a telecommunications recommendation of the ITU-T